Piera Martell (born 2 July 1943, in Jona, St. Gallen) is a Swiss singer, best known for her participation in the 1974 Eurovision Song Contest.

In 1974, Martell took part in the Swiss Eurovision selection with the song "Mein Ruf nach dir" ("My Call to You"), which won the competition and went forward to the 19th Eurovision Song Contest, held in Brighton, England on 6 April. In what is considered one of the strongest Eurovisions, won by ABBA and featuring already internationally known performers such as Olivia Newton-John, Gigliola Cinquetti and Mouth & MacNeal, "Mein Ruf nach dir" picked up only three points, finishing in joint last place (with the songs from Germany, Norway and Portugal) of the 17 entries.

Martell went on to make three further attempts to perform at Eurovision, without success. In 1976, she entered the German selection ("Ein neuer Tag" – 11th), followed by two more participations in the Swiss selection in 1977 ("Aldo Rinaldo" – 4th) and 1978 ("Hier, Pierre" – 6th). She continued performing and releasing singles periodically until her retirement from the music industry in 1981.

References 

 

1943 births
Living people
Eurovision Song Contest entrants of 1974
People from Rapperswil-Jona
Eurovision Song Contest entrants for Switzerland
20th-century Swiss women singers